No. 567 Squadron was an anti-aircraft co-operation squadron of the Royal Air Force, formed during World War II and active between December 1943 and June 1946 in the defence of south-east England.

History
No. 567 Squadron was formed on 1 December 1943 at RAF Detling, Kent from No. 1624 (Anti-Aircraft Co-Operation) Flight. The anti-aircraft co-operation duties included target-towing with Miles Martinets, gun-laying and searchlight practice with Airspeed Oxfords and simulated attacks on exercising troops with Hawker Hurricanes. After the end of World War II, the Martinets gave way for the Vultee Vengeances and the Hurricanes were replaced with Supermarine Spitfires. The Oxfords stayed with the squadron till it was disbanded, 15 June 1946 at RAF West Malling.

Aircraft operated

Squadron bases

References

Notes

Bibliography

External links
 567 Squadron history on MOD site

Aircraft squadrons of the Royal Air Force in World War II
567 Squadron
Military units and formations established in 1943
Military units and formations disestablished in 1946